HMS Restoration has been the name two Royal Navy ships, named after the English Restoration.

 , third rate, 70 guns, built Betts, Harwich 1678; Rebuilt 1702; wrecked in the Great Storm of 1703.
 , third rate, 70 guns.  Wrecked in 1711.

References
 

Restoration, HMS